Reiner Ferreira Correa Gomes (born 17 November 1985) is a Brazilian professional footballer who currently plays for Boa Esporte Clube.

Previously Ferreira played in the Portuguese Primeira Liga for Académica and for various clubs in his native country at levels up to Série B.

Career statistics

Club

Honours

Club 
San Francisco Deltas:
 Soccer Bowl: 2017

References

External links 

 
 

1985 births
Living people
Footballers from São Paulo
Association football defenders
Brazilian footballers
Brazilian expatriate sportspeople in the United States
Atlético Clube Paranavaí players
Criciúma Esporte Clube players
Al-Wasl F.C. players
America Football Club (RJ) players
Esporte Clube Juventude players
Agremiação Sportiva Arapiraquense players
Associação Académica de Coimbra – O.A.F. players
Suwon Samsung Bluewings players
Campeonato Brasileiro Série B players
Primeira Liga players
K League 1 players
San Francisco Deltas players
Indy Eleven players
North American Soccer League players
UAE Pro League players